"Let's Dance" is the first single from English boy band Five's third and final studio album, Kingsize. The song was written by Richard Stannard, Julian Gallagher, Ash Howes, Martin Harrington, Abz Love, Jason "J" Brown, and Sean Conlon and produced by Stannard and Gallagher. Released on 13 August 2001, "Let's Dance" charted at number one on the UK Singles Chart, becoming Five's third and final number-one single, and was certified silver by the British Phonographic Industry (BPI). The song also peaked at number two in the Irish Singles Chart and became a top-10 in hit in Australia, Flanders, Greece, and Romania.

Music video
The official music video was directed by Max and Dania. The music video used a life sized cardboard image of Conlon, since he was not present at the time of filming having actually left the band. The video was also the last music video that the band recorded together, as the video for "Closer to Me" was a compilation of old video footage, and the video for "Rock the Party" was animated.

Track listings

UK and Irish CD1
 "Let's Dance" (radio edit) – 3:38
 "Sometimes" – 3:51
 "Let's Dance" (The Kinkyboy remix) – 6:30
 "Let's Dance" (director's cut video) – 5:17

UK and Irish CD2
 "Let's Dance" (radio edit) – 3:38
 "Millenium Megamix" – 5:12
 CD-ROM interviews

UK cassette single and European CD single
 "Let's Dance" (radio edit) – 3:38
 "Sometimes" – 3:51

Australian CD single
 "Let's Dance" (radio edit) – 3:38
 "Sometimes" – 5:12
 "Let's Dance" (The Kinkyboy mix) – 6:30
 "Millenium Megamix" – 5:12

Credits and personnel
Credits are taken from the Kingsize album booklet.

Studio
 Mixed at Biffco Studios (Dublin, Ireland)

Personnel

 Richard "Biff" Stannard – writing (as Richard Stannard), backing vocals, production
 Julian Gallagher – writing, guitars, production
 Ash Howes – writing, keyboards, programming, recording, mixing
 Martin Harrington – writing, keyboards, programming, recording
 Abz Love – writing (as Richard Breen)
 Jason Brown – writing
 Sean Conlon – writing
 Andy Caine – backing vocals
 Steve Lewinson – bass
 Simon Hale – keyboards
 Alvin Sweeney – recording

Charts

Weekly charts

Year-end charts

Certifications and sales

Release history

References

2000 songs
2001 singles
Bertelsmann Music Group singles
Five (band) songs
Number-one singles in Scotland
RCA Records singles
Song recordings produced by Richard Stannard (songwriter)
Songs about dancing
Songs written by Abz Love
Songs written by Jason "J" Brown
Songs written by Julian Gallagher
Songs written by Martin Harrington
Songs written by Richard Stannard (songwriter)
Songs written by Sean Conlon
UK Singles Chart number-one singles